Rapperswil Peninsula is a peninsula in Rapperswil on the northeastern Lake Zürich shore in Switzerland. On the northwest, Kempratnerbucht (bay of Kempraten) is situated, on the south Seedamm respectively Holzbrücke Rapperswil-Hurden is linking both shores of the lake respectively Obersee (upper Lake Zürich).

Kapuzinerkloster Rapperswil (Capuchin monastery), Rapperswil Castle and partially the Altstadt of the city of Rapperswil is located on this rocky peninsula, in Swiss German usually called Endingen on its western lower side, Lindenhof on its western and Herrenberg on its eastern hilltop.

Neither "Rapperswil Peninsula" nor the Swiss German term "Rapperswiler Halbinsel" or "Halbinsel von Rapperswil" is commonly used.

Peninsulas of Switzerland
Lake Zurich